The East London derby is a football match that takes place between two of either Dagenham & Redbridge, Leyton Orient and West Ham United. This derby rarely takes place because, as is the case with the Dockers Derby, the clubs are usually in different leagues.

All three clubs were part of the county of Essex before 1965, since when they have been part of the county of Greater London.  Leyton Orient's original home was in Clapton, which was just over the border in the County of London, before they moved to Leyton in 1937.

The last time West Ham United and Leyton Orient shared a competitive meeting was on 31 January 1987 in the FA Cup which West Ham won 4–1 with their goals coming from McAvennie, Cottee, Keen and Parris. West Ham and Dagenham & Redbridge have never met since the latter was formed in 1992 from the merger of Redbridge Forest and Dagenham. However, Leyton Orient and Dagenham & Redbridge meet occasionally in the lower leagues. They played each other in the National League in the 2017–18 season and the 2018-19 season.

West Ham United vs Leyton Orient
There is very little current rivalry between Leyton Orient and West Ham, mainly due to the fact that they have been in different divisions for over 41 years. The last time that the two clubs ever shared a division was in the old Second Division in the season 1980–81.

Matches
Statistics

All-time result
League

Cup

Dagenham & Redbridge vs Leyton Orient
The rivalry between Dagenham & Redbridge and Leyton Orient started very recently, dating back to 1992–93 FA Cup, where Orient won in the first round 4–5 at Dagenham. A total of 13 matches have been played to date with Orient having the upper hand with six victories against five for Dagenham, with two games ending in a draw.

Matches
Statistics

All-time result
League

Cup

References

Leyton Orient F.C.
West Ham United F.C.
Dagenham & Redbridge F.C.
London derbies
England football derbies